The Dăncilă Cabinet was the 128th Government of Romania. It was led by Viorica Dăncilă, who assumed office as Prime Minister of Romania along with her cabinet on 29 January 2018.

Led by Viorica Dăncilă, this cabinet was constituted and supported by a center-left coalition between the Social Democratic Party (PSD) and the Alliance of Liberals and Democrats (ALDE). Together, they had 167 deputies of 329, or 50.8% of seats in the Chamber of Deputies, and 76 senators from 136, or 55.9% of Senate seats.

On 26 January 2018, the composition of the government was announced. The government gained a vote of confidence on 29 January in Parliament with 282 votes in favor, 48 more than the constitutional majority required, thanks to the support of UDMR and deputies representing national minorities.

The government took office on 29 January after the resignation of the Social Democratic Tudose Cabinet. Dăncilă became the first woman to lead a government in Romania.

On 10 October 2019, a no-confidence vote to dissolve the Dăncilă Cabinet was adopted in Parliament with 238 votes in favour and 4 against.

References 

2018 establishments in Romania
2019 disestablishments in Romania
Cabinets established in 2018
Cabinets disestablished in 2019
Cabinets of Romania